Success is a special service area in the Canadian province of Saskatchewan within the Rural Municipality of Riverside No. 168 and Census Division No. 8. It held village status between 1912 and 2022.

History 
Success incorporated as a village on October 25, 1912. It restructured on July 15, 2022, relinquishing its village status in favour of becoming a special service area under the jurisdiction of the Rural Municipality of Riverside No. 168.

Geography 
Success is along the Great Sandhills Railway line and Saskatchewan Highway 32. The Success Power Station operated by SaskPower is near the community.

Demographics 

Notable people
Bridget Moran
Ryan Evans

References

Special service areas in Saskatchewan
Riverside No. 168, Saskatchewan
Division No. 8, Saskatchewan